The Academy of Social Sciences is a learned society in the United Kingdom.

Academy of Social Sciences may also refer to:
 Chinese Academy of Social Sciences
 Pontifical Academy of Social Sciences
 Shanghai Academy of Social Sciences

See also 
 Academician
 Academy of the Social Sciences in Australia
 Campaign for Social Science
 Learned society
 Social sciences